Diane Michelle Elam is an American feminist writer, the author of Feminism and Deconstruction: Ms. en Abyme (1994), Romancing the Postmodern (1992) and co-editor (with Robyn Wiegman) of Feminism Beside Itself (1995).

A recurrent theme in her work is an argument against the possibility of a complete and definitive representation of woman.

Life 
Elam was born on April 17, 1958 in Riverside, California. She is the daughter of father, Douglas Bradley and mother, Leslie J. (Parman) Elam.

Elam went to Kenyon College in 1980, and graduated from Brown University with a Masters of Arts in 1984 and received her Doctor of Philosophy from Brown as well in 1988. Elam was also professor of English literature and critical and cultural theory at Cardiff University in Wales, at Indiana University in Bloomington in the 1990s, and at Bryn Mawr College in Pennsylvania.  Before his death in an airplane crash in 1994, she was married to fellow academic Bill Readings, a professor of Comparative Literature at the Université de Montréal.

Works
Diane Elam; Robyn Wiegman, Feminism beside itself New York ; London : Routledge, 1995. 
 Romancing the postmodern,  London ; New York : Routledge, 1992. 
 Feminism and deconstruction : Ms. en abyme,  London ; New York : Routledge, 1994.

References

External links
Gorton, Kristyn. Diane Elam's Work, 1999. Retrieved June 27, 2007.
Culture Machine: Profiles of Contributors

Academics of Cardiff University
Bryn Mawr College faculty
American feminist writers
Indiana University faculty
Living people
1958 births
Postmodern feminists